Echinicola is an aerobic and motile bacterial genus from the family of Cyclobacteriaceae.

References

Further reading 
 
 
 

Cytophagia
Bacteria genera